Dana Kimmell (born May 21, 1959) is an American actress and model. She is best recognized for her performance as Chris Higgins in the Steve Miner-directed 3D horror film Friday the 13th Part III (1982)—which debuted at number one at the United States box office. She also starred as teenaged characters in the slasher Sweet Sixteen (1983) and the Western Lone Wolf McQuade (1983). 

On television, Kimmell portrayed Dawn Marshall in an episode of the soap opera Another World (1980) before reprising the role in the first season of the spin-off series Texas (1980). She also had guest appearances on series such as Charlie's Angels (1977), Diff'rent Strokes (1981-84), The Facts of Life (1982), Days of Our Lives (1983-84), Hotel (1986), and The Young and the Restless (1984).

Career

Early life
Dana Kimmell was born on May 21, 1959, the daughter of Dolores and W. Dane Kimmell, she grew up in Kingsburg, California, attending primary school until her family moved to Center, Texas. In 1974, she was one of eight girls selected from 20,000 by Teen magazine to model in Hollywood for a week. The following year, the magazine brought her back to appear on a cover. She returned to Kingsburg her senior year, where she graduated Bullard High School in Fresno as valedictorian of her class in 1977 and signed with Nina Blanchard's modeling agency. Kimmell pursued acting locally, participating in various talent shows and school and church-orientated programs. Kimmell obtained an agent following graduation and made her professional acting debut on the television series Charlie's Angels (1977). Kimmell attended the University of California for two years before dropping out to focus on her acting career.  She is married and has four children. Her eldest son Cody died in 2021.

Sweet Sixteen, Friday the 13th Part III, and Lone Wolf McQuade
Kimmell made her theatrical debut in Jim Sotos' slasher film Sweet Sixteen (1983). She describes the script she initially read as a "great family-type" film but alleges Sotos persuaded actress Aleisa Shirley into doing nude scenes after filming was complete that earned the film it's R Rating. Kimmell's efforts to voice her complaints went unnoticed, with Sotos' asking her to "name one star who has made it without taking her shirt off," which prompted Kimmell to set guidelines for herself when pursuing projects: no nudity and no profanity. An independent film, Kimmell wasn't sure that a major distributor would pick the film up. Her role in Sweet Sixteen caught the attention of one of the men financing Steve Miner's Friday the 13th Part III (1982). The producer (Frank Mancuso Jr.) and director (Steve Miner) contacted her and asked her to star in the film as Chris Higgins, a character she describes as "a young college girl who takes her friends up in the mountains." Despite generally not liking violence, she has no problems with the violence depicted in  Friday the 13th, stating it's not meant to be taken seriously and serves as "shock value" and entertainment for audiences. 

Kimmell did have issues with certain unnecessary sex scenes. Kimmell has expressed gratitude for the film, stating that "it's by no means a cheap horror film," and described her role as a "good part." The film was a box office success, grossing over $34 million worldwide. Her last theatrical role would be Sally McQuade, Chuck Norris's character's daughter, in Lone Wolf McQuade (1983), another box office success. Kimmell would describe her part in Sweet Sixteen as her favorite of her three films.

Television career
Kimmell's most prominent role on television would be Dawn Marshall, "the youngest daughter of the oil and land-rich Marshall family of Houston,"  in the NBC soap opera Texas for which she is credited for fifty-one episodes. She was selected for the role of Dawn in early 1980, and first portrayed the character in an episode of Another World (1980). Kimmell departed from the show when it was renewed for a second season. Throughout 1977-1988, Kimmell had a nearly decade-long career of guest work in television. She appeared in one episode of Charlie's Angels (1977), Eight Is Enough (1977), Out of the Blue (1979), Bosom Buddies (1981), Code Red (1981), The Facts of Life (1982), Happy Days (1982), Private Benjamin (1982), Fame (1983), Alice (1983), Anatomy of a Scene (1983), The A-Team (1983), Dynasty (1983), Hollywood Beat (1984), Hotel (1986), You Again? (1986), Hunter (1986), and  Out of This World (1988).  In addition to television series, Kimmell appeared in television films. She appeared in Rivals (1981), Midnight Offerings (1981) as Lily, Return of the Beverly Hillbillies (1981), By Dawn's Early Light (1990), and Sins of the Mother (2001).

Filmography

Film

Television

References

External links
 
 
 Clips from Texas episodes

1959 births
Living people
American film actresses
American television actresses
American soap opera actresses
Actresses from Arkansas
People from Texarkana, Arkansas
21st-century American women